People's Television Network may refer to:

National Broadcasting Network (Lebanon), the official television of the Lebanese Amal Movement
National Broadcasting Network (Trinidad and Tobago)
People's Television Network, formerly National Broadcasting Network (Philippines)